Sancha of Castile (–1179) was daughter of Alfonso VII of León and Castile and his first wife Berengaria of Barcelona. Sancha was the fifth child of seven born to her parents.

On 20 July 1153, Sancha married Sancho VI of Navarre. He is responsible for bringing his kingdom into the political orbit of Europe.  As "la reyna de Navarra, filla del emperador" (the queen of Navarre, daughter of the Emperor) her August 1179 death was reported in the Annales Toledanos.

Issue 
Sancho and Sancha's children were:

Sancho VII
Ferdinand
Ramiro, Bishop of Pamplona
Berengaria (died 1230 or 1232), married King Richard I of England
Constance
Blanche, married Count Theobald III of Champagne, then acted as regent of Champagne, and finally as regent of Navarre
Theresa

Sancha was buried in Pamplona.

Family tree

References

1130s births
1179 deaths
Year of birth uncertain
Navarrese royal consorts
Castilian House of Burgundy
Leonese infantas
Castilian infantas
Burials at Pamplona Cathedral
12th-century nobility from the Kingdom of Navarre
12th-century Spanish women
Daughters of emperors
Daughters of kings